Maran Qaleh (also Romanized as Mārān Qal‘eh; also known as Galū, Mārān Galū, Mārāngelī, Mārān Gellā, and Maran Ghal‘eh) is a village in Khatunabad Rural District, in the Central District of Jiroft County, Kerman Province, Iran. At the 2006 census, its population was 170, in 37 families.

References 

Populated places in Jiroft County